Coleraine Castle was a castle situated at Coleraine, County Londonderry, Northern Ireland. 

The Annals of Ulster reports that the Earl of Atholl, Thomas fitz Roland, built the castle in 1214. It was later destroyed by Hugh de Lacy and the King of Tír Eoghain, Aodh Méith Ó Néill, as evidenced by the same source in 1223. 

The Annals of Ulster also reports that Thomas reconstructed the castle in 1228. There is evidence to suggest that Thomas may not have been in any position to carry out reconstruction efforts. In 1225, he was owed an annuity of 100 marks in compensation for his Irish losses. In 1227, he declared that he had been impoverished through serving the English Crown in Ireland. If it wasn't Thomas was reconstructed Coleraine Castle, it is possible that Hugh did. However, the only record of Hugh operating in Thomas' lands occurs almost two decades later, in 1241.

Citations

Primary sources

Secondary sources

Castles in County Londonderry